The Vandals were an late 1970s English rock band from Basildon, Essex, England. Playing in the punk rock style, they are mainly notable for featuring vocalist Alison Moyet; 'Alf' as she was then known, who later found fame as one half of 1980s synthpop act Yazoo. The other members were Robert Marlow, who during his tenure with the band was known as 'the guitarist with no name', two other female backing singers, Kim Forey and Sue Paget (Susan Ryder Paget), who also played bass at the band's later gigs, and Simon Kirk on drums, who was later replaced by John Dee, formerly of Southend band The Machines.

They were mainly active in 1978 and some notable gigs included those at Leigh-on-Sea's Grand Hotel, Woodlands Youth Centre, Basildon and "Upstairs at Turkans" at the Van Gogh in Basildon. They also made an unscheduled appearance at the 1st Rock Festival held at Gloucester Park, Basildon in August 1978.

References

English new wave musical groups
English punk rock groups
Music in Essex